Itati is a municipality of Rio Grande do Sul, Brazil.

References

Populated coastal places in Rio Grande do Sul
Municipalities in Rio Grande do Sul